Seanna Mitchell (born July 2, 1988 in Montreal, Quebec) is a female swimmer from Canada, who mostly competes in the freestyle events. She claimed a silver medal (4 × 100 m freestyle) at the 2007 Pan American Games in Rio de Janeiro, Brazil.

References
Profile Canadian Olympic Committee

1988 births
Canadian female freestyle swimmers
Living people
Swimmers from Montreal
Swimmers at the 2007 Pan American Games
University of Calgary alumni
Pan American Games silver medalists for Canada
Pan American Games medalists in swimming
Universiade medalists in swimming
Universiade bronze medalists for Canada
Medalists at the 2007 Summer Universiade
Medalists at the 2009 Summer Universiade
Medalists at the 2007 Pan American Games